St-Gingolph railway station is a railway station in the municipality of Saint-Gingolph, in the Swiss canton of Valais. It is the northern terminus of the Saint-Gingolph–Saint-Maurice line and is served by local trains only. The station sits on the border between Switzerland and France; there is no rail service on the French side.

Services 
The following services stop at St-Gingolph:

References

External links 
 
 
 

Railway stations in the canton of Valais
Swiss Federal Railways stations